Otto Wilhelm Sohn-Rethel (1877–1949) German lepidopterist and a painter of the Düsseldorf school of painting art movement. Sohn-Rethel was a member of the art groups, Sonderbund group and Young Rhineland. The prominent theme of his art was always young men, and frequently they were nude.

Life and work 
Otto Wilhelm Sohn-Rethel was born on 18 January 1877 in Düsseldorf, Germany. He was the second son to artists Karl Rudolf Sohn and Else Sohn-Rethel. He was given the name "Otto Wilhelm" after his great uncles, the painters  and Wilhelm Sohn. In the summer of 1883, Sohn-Rethel's interest in butterflies began in-part because of his uncle, Erich Hettner (1868–1933).

Starting in 1890, he studied at Kunstakademie Düsseldorf (Düsseldorf Art Academy) under artists Heinrich Lauenstein, Hugo Crola, and Adolf Schill. Followed by study at Académie Julian in Paris. He was a member of the Deutscher Künstlerbund (Association of German Artists).

Besides painting, he was a lepidopterist and studied and collected butterfly and moth species between 1902 and 1912. One of which was the moth subspecies named after him, Chortodes morrisii sohnretheli.

In 1902, Sohn-Rethel started his travels in Rome, followed by Frascati, and finally in 1904 to Anacapri a city on the island of Capri. His wealth allowed him to live in Capri, a place that was known as a gay community at the time. He painted portraits and figure studies, many of nude men once here. One of his students during this period was the young Italian artist, Giovanni Tessitore. He maintained a studio in Rome. In the winter of 1903–1904 he sublet his Rome studio Villa Strohl-Fern to Rainer Maria Rilke. In 1906, he met up in Rome with his brother Karli, his brother-in-law Werner Heuser, and artists Karl Hofer, Hermann Haller and Maurice Sterne.

In 1909, Otto Sohn-Rethel joined the Sonderbund group with other Düsseldorf painters, which included Julius Bretz, Max Clarenbach, August Deusser, Walter Ophey, Wilhelm Schmurr, and his brothers Karli Sohn-Rethel and Alfred Sohn-Rethel. In 1919, Sohn-Rethel joined the art group, Young Rhineland.

During World War I, Sohn-Rethel served in the war and was stationed in Düsseldorf. During this time he painted the wounded soldiers and would provide precise descriptions and images. After the war he settled in Anacapri, Italy, and lived at Villa Lina. Villa Lina became a meeting place for the expatriate community including his nephew Alfred Sohn-Rethel, writer Norman Douglas, among others.

He died on 7 June 1949 in Anacapri, Italy, where he is buried.

Selected works

References

External links 

Artist: Otto Sohn-Rethel in European Paintings and Drawings 1905–1915, Database of Modern Exhibitions (DoME), Institute for Art History at University of Vienna

1877 births
1949 deaths
Artists from Düsseldorf
Kunstakademie Düsseldorf alumni
German male painters
German lepidopterists
Queer artists
Académie Julian alumni